Jean-Baptiste Colbert, Marquess of Torcy (14 September 1665 – 2 September 1746), generally called Colbert de Torcy, was a French diplomat, who negotiated some of the most important treaties towards the end of Louis XIV's reign, notably the treaty (1700) that occasioned the War of the Spanish Succession (1701–1714), in which the dying Charles II of Spain named Louis XIV's grandson, Philippe, duc d'Anjou, heir to the Spanish throne, eventually founding the line of Spanish Bourbons.

Biography
Born in Paris, the son of Charles Colbert, Louis's minister of foreign affairs and the nephew of Jean-Baptiste Colbert, Louis' chief advisor, for whom the Torcy title was created, Colbert de Torcy was a brilliant and precocious legal student. As a very young man, he assisted his father in sensitive diplomatic missions. Colbert de Torcy proved himself so able that in 1689, Louis XIV granted him the right to succeed to his father's position as minister of foreign affairs, a position he fulfilled from 28 July 1696 to 23 September 1715.

He was the guiding spirit of French diplomacy at the series of international conferences that resulted in the Treaty of Utrecht (1713) and the Treaty of Rastatt (1714) and was concerned with professionalizing the conduct of diplomacy. He instituted an académie politique to train young professionals in the equivalent of a foreign service bureaucracy: it did not survive his retirement, but his establishment at Versailles of a centralized diplomatic archive (1710) has been a service to historians.
Louis XIV was his foreign relation.

The aged king, recognizing that Colbert de Torcy had been a de facto secretary of state, named him such in his will, but when Louis died in 1715, his will was broken; the Regent, Philippe, Duke of Orléans deprived Colbert de Torcy of any political power, and he settled into a long retirement, during which he was a member of the unofficial political salon called the Entresol, which formed in the early years of Louis XV's maturity when the abbé Alary, a protégé of Fleury, convened an occasional political discussion group in the entresol of his apartment in Place Vendôme. There in sociable surroundings, sharing the gossip and news Colbert de Torcy debated contemporary events in a sympathetic circle and like others, doubtless read aloud and elicited comment upon the political writings.

The architect Germain Boffrand had built a series of  hôtels particuliers in the new district, the  Faubourg Saint-Honoré, and Colbert de Torcy purchased one as a semi-finished shell, 14 November 1715, which he finished as a suitable Paris residence, the hôtel de Torcy (later the hôtel de Beauharnais, now the German Embassy  78, rue de Lille). There his magnificent installation among his tapestries, furnishings paintings, Chinese porcelains mounted in gilt-bronze, sculptures and other works of art above all in his cabinet doré, giving onto the salon that was lit from both sides, provided him solace and comfort in a long and productive retirement, in which he completed his  Mémoirs pour servir à l'histoire des négotiations depuis le Traité de Riswick jusqu'à la Paix d'Utrecht, published in  1756.

Colbert de Torcy died at Paris in 1746. His official portrait was painted by Hyacinthe Rigaud. Colbert de Torcy is commemorated in the rue de Torcy, Paris XVIIIème .

References
 
 Childs, Nick (2000) A Political Academy in Paris 1724-1731: The Entresol and Its Members in series Studies on Voltaire and the Eighteenth Century. (Oxford: Voltaire Foundation) . Review by Thomas E. Kaiser

Further reading 
  Electronically available by subscription Ebrary; EBSCO; and des Libris.

1665 births
1746 deaths
Diplomats from Paris
People of the Regency of Philippe d'Orléans
People of the Ancien Régime
17th-century French diplomats
18th-century French diplomats
French Foreign Ministers
Members of the French Academy of Sciences
Ambassadors of France to Prussia
French marquesses